is a Japanese erotic actress, singer, writer, and AV and film director. She has been called "the first hard-core porn actress in Japan".

Life and career

Early life
Kyōko Aizome was born in Noda Chiba Prefecture. She grew up in a troubled household, her father was a police officer who beat his wife, and her parents divorced about 1974, when Aizome was 16 years old. Soon after graduation from high school, Aizome was scouted in Tokyo's Shinjuku neighborhood by a photographer for nude magazines. She saw nude modeling as a stepping-stone into a career in entertainment.

Daydream
Pioneer pink film director Tetsuji Takechi noticed Aizome in one of her nude photo magazine appearances. Pinku eiga, or "pink films", are the softcore genre of sex-film which dominated Japan's domestic cinema during the 1960s and 1970s. Tetsuji had made Daydream (1964), the first big-budget pink film. He chose Aizome to star in his hardcore remake of this film, also called Daydream (1981), giving the actress her leading-role debut. Japan's first theatrically released film featuring hardcore sex, Aizome added to the controversy surrounding the film by admitting to having performed actual sexual intercourse on camera. Though, as Japanese law required, sexual organs and pubic hair were fogged on screen, the Asahi Shimbun calls it Japan's first hardcore pornographic movie. By 1981, hardcore AVs (adult videos) were already starting to win over the adult entertainment audience in Japan, but the film became a hit with theatrical audiences. Uncensored copies of the film were also circulated illegally.

After Daydream
After Daydream, Aizome became active in Japan's prolific adult video and pink film industries. She made her debut in the still-young AV industry in November 1981 with April of Lust for director Tadashi Yoyogi, making her one of Japan's earliest AV idols. Her name became a marketing tool and was used in the titles of such later theatrical releases as Yoyogi's Kyōko Aizome's Somber Reminiscence (Aizome Kyōko Kareinaru Tsuioku) (1983) and Shin'ya Yamamoto's Kyōko Aizome's Widow's Boarding House (Aizome Kyōko no Mibōjin Geshuku) (1984).

Aizome's fame also led her to embark on a successful live-performance career in striptease, which lasted until her retirement in July 1994. While engaged in stripping, she was arrested twice in 1983 for indecent exposure. She used her jail time to review her career and rededicate herself to a life in adult entertainment. She also resolved to build a two-story, six-bedroom house in Chiba Prefecture, which she gave to her mother.

About 1986, in one of her more remarkable performances, Aizome had her hymen surgically restored so that it could be broken during the film. Previously a common procedure, hymen restorations went out of favor in Japan about the time of Aizome's use of it. The doctor who performed the restoration reports that the last time he did this surgery was on a couple in their 50s who, after seeing Aizome's film, wished to undergo the operation for their second honeymoon. In an article on the procedure, Aizome told Shukan Bunshun, "They strung a thread almost like a piano wire through the entrance to my vagina and pulled it like a drawstring to recreate the hymen. They give your privates a local anesthetic, so the operation itself doesn't really hurt. I really felt like a virgin again."

Aizome gained an international audience in the 1986 Traci Lords film, Traci Takes Tokyo. With her name mis-credited as "Kyōko Izoma", the porn-video was shot in Tokyo before Lords' scandal, and is therefore now illegal in the U.S.

Takechi Tetsuji filmed Daydream for the third time in 1987, as Daydream 2 (Hakujitsumu Zoku), and again hired Aizome for the lead role. According to the Weissers, each filming of Daydream had become progressively more exploitive, with the last, imported to the United States under the title Captured For Sex having the lowest production values and focusing most on sex and a torture orgy.

Later career
She retired from regular performances in pornography in 1994, but continued to act in erotic films occasionally in later years. She would also work behind the camera in the industry in various capacities including writing and directing. In 2001 Aizome was writing a sex- and health-advice column for women in Japan, titled "Auntie Agony".

She teamed up with "AV Queen" Hitomi Kobayashi in the February 2001 theatrical release, Kyōko Aizome vs. Hitomi Kobayashi: Sexual Excitement Competition (愛染恭子ＶＳ小林ひとみ　発情くらべ). Aizome both starred in and directed the film, which was released by Nikkatsu's post-Roman porn distributor of theatrical pornography, Excess films. An adult video starring the two actresses and also directed by Aizome followed in March. Entitled Lesbian Wives, the video had Aizome and Kobayashi playing the wives of two yakuza bosses who become engaged in a lesbian relationship. Two years later, she directed the AV Lesbian Politicians (2003), in which she also co-starred with the popular award-winning AV actress Ai Kurosawa. In late 2003, she directed and co-starred with another "mature" AV actress, Eri Kikuchi, in the softcore film Double G-Spot: Kyôko Aizome vs. Eri Kikuchi.

In October 2005, she starred in the Madonna hardcore AV Widow's Obscene Desire (愛欲の未亡人) which won her a Madonna Best Actress Award at the 2005 Moodyz Awards. She also appeared in a further video for Madonna, Mother and Son Incest (近親相姦 母と息子) with Yume Imano in May 2006 when Aizome was 48 years old.

Aizome's name was in the news again in 2007 when she was arrested for beating her niece. Aizome admitted to the allegations and was fined 500,000 yen. She explained, "I hit my niece to punish her for dating my boyfriend. But it went too far."

Co-directing with Shinji Imaoka, Aizome filmed a fourth version of Tanizaki and Takechi's Daydream, which was released on September 5, 2009. In March 2010, she played the female lead as Kikue, a masochistic elderly woman in The Slave Ship, an adaptation of Oniroku Dan novella Dorei-bune (奴隷船). Six months later she starred in her retirement adult video Retirement, the Last Production for Moodyz at age 52.

Selected filmography

Sources
 
 
 
 
 
 
 
 
 
 
 description of Hakujitsumu and Aizome – cult-films review site

References

External links
 Kyōko Aizome's personal website (in Japanese)
 

Living people
1958 births
People from Noda, Chiba
Women pornographic film directors
Japanese female adult models
Japanese pornographic film actresses
Japanese women pop singers
Japanese people of Canadian descent
Japanese pornographic film directors
Japanese women writers
Actors from Chiba Prefecture
Pink film actors
Pink film directors
20th-century Japanese actresses
21st-century Japanese actresses
Models from Chiba Prefecture
Musicians from Chiba Prefecture